The Mirogoj City Cemetery, also known as Mirogoj Cemetery, is a cemetery park that is considered to be among the more noteworthy landmarks in the city of Zagreb. The cemetery inters members of all religious groups: Catholic, Orthodox, Muslim, Jewish, Protestant, Latter Day Saints; irreligious graves can all be found. In the arcades are the last resting places of many famous Croats.

History

The Mirogoj Cemetery was built on a plot of land owned by the linguist Ljudevit Gaj, purchased by the city in 1872, after his death. Architect Hermann Bollé designed the main building. The new cemetery was inaugurated on 6 November 1876.

The construction of the arcades, the cupolas, and the church in the entryway was begun in 1879. Due to lack of funding, work was finished only in 1929.

Unlike the older cemeteries, which were church-owned, Mirogoj was owned by the city, and accepted burials from all religious backgrounds.

On 22 March 2020, during the COVID-19 pandemic, Zagreb was hit by a 5.5 magnitude earthquake that caused significant damage across the city, including the damage on the famous arcades of the Mirogoj cemetery.

Notable interments

 Zlatko Baloković (1895–1965), violinist
 Milan Bandić (1955–2021), longest-serving mayor of Zagreb
 Ena Begović (1960–2000), actress
 Miroslav Blažević (1935–2023), football player and later manager
 Hermann Bollé (1845–1926), architect
 Ivana Brlić-Mažuranić (1874–1938), writer
 Ferdinand Budicki (1871–1951), automotive and air travel pioneer of Zagreb, introduced cars to the city
 Krešimir Ćosić (1948–1995), basketball player and coach, member of both the Naismith Memorial Basketball Hall of Fame and FIBA Hall of Fame
 Tošo Dabac (1907–1970), photographer
 Arsen Dedić (1938–2015), singer-songwriter and composer
 Dimitrija Demeter (1811–1872), Greek–Croatian who played a major role in the movement for the national awakening of the Croatian nation
 Filip Deutsch (1828–1919), nobleman and industrialist
 Julio Deutsch (1859–1922), architect and co-owner of the architecture studio Hönigsberg & Deutsch
 Janko Drašković (1770–1856), nobleman, national reformer, politician and poet
 Rajko Dujmić, songwriter and composer (1954–2020)
 Hugo Ehrlich (1879–1936), architect
 Aleksandar Ehrmann (1879–1965), industrialist, philanthropist and diplomat
 Ljudevit Gaj (1809–1872), co-founder of the Illyrian movement
 Leo Hönigsberg (1861–1911), architect and co-owner of the architecture studio Hönigsberg & Deutsch
 Hosea Jacobi (1841–1925), Chief Rabbi of Zagreb
 Miroslav Krleža (1893–1981), writer
 Oton Kučera (1857–1931), astronomer
 Zinka Kunc-Milanov (1906–1989), famous soprano
 Svetozar Kurepa (1929–2010), mathematician
 Ante Kovačić (1854–1889), writer
 Vatroslav Lisinski (1819–1854), composer
 Vladko Maček (1879–1964), politician
 Savić Marković Štedimlija (1906–1971), publicist
 Antun Gustav Matoš (1873–1914), writer
 Andrija Mohorovičić (1857–1936), seismologist
 Edo Murtić (1921–2005), painter
 Vladimir Nazor (1876–1949), writer
 Maximilian Njegovan (1858–1930), Commander-in-chief and admiral of the Austro-Hungarian Navy
 Slavoljub Eduard Penkala (1871–1922), inventor
 Dražen Petrović (1964–1993), basketball player, member of both the Naismith and FIBA Halls of Fame
 Milka Planinc (1924–2010), first and only female prime minister of Yugoslavia
 Vladimir Prelog (1906–1998), Nobel prize-winning chemist
 Petar Preradović (1818–1872), poet
 Stjepan Radić (1871–1928), leader of the Croatian Peasants Party
 August Šenoa (1838–1881), writer
 Ivica Šerfezi (1935–2004), singer and politician supporter of Croatian Peasant Party
 Ivan Šubašić (1892–1955), last Ban of Croatia
 Milka Ternina (1863–1941), famous soprano
 Franjo Tuđman (1922–1999), the first president of Croatia
 Vice Vukov (1936–2008), singer and politician
 Tin Ujević (1891–1955), poet
 Emil Uzelac (1867–1954), head of the Austro-Hungarian air force
 Ivan Zajc (1832–1914), composer

Memorials
 Monument to Fallen Croatian Soldiers in World War I (1919)
 Monument to the children from the Kozara mountain
 Tomb of the People's Heroes (1968)
 Memorial Cross to Croatian Home Guard Soldiers (1993)
 Monument to the Victims of Bleiburg and the Way of the Cross (1994)
 German military cemetery (1996) for more than 4.430 deaths
 Monument of the "Voice of Croatian Victims - Wall of Pain" (to Croatian victims of the Croatian War of Independence)

Location and access
It is located today in the Gornji Grad–Medveščak city district, on Mirogojska road and Hermann Bollé street.

ZET bus line 106 runs between the cemetery and the Kaptol bus terminal in the heart of Zagreb every 20 minutes during the cemetery's opening hours.
A less frequent line, 226 (every 35–40 minutes), also starts from Kaptol by the same route, but continues further east to Svetice terminal, directly connecting to the Maksimir Park.

Gallery

See also

 History of Zagreb

References

Further reading

External links

  
 Mirogoj Cemetery at Association of Significant Cemeteries in Europe

Cemeteries in Croatia
Eastern Orthodox cemeteries
Jewish cemeteries
Roman Catholic cemeteries
Lutheran cemeteries
Protestant Reformed cemeteries
Buildings and structures in Zagreb
Gornji Grad–Medveščak
Hermann Bollé buildings
1876 establishments in Austria-Hungary